Kalinkavichy District, Kalinkavičy Rajon or Kalinkavicki Rajon is a district of Gomel Region, in Belarus.

In 1998, the rural area was united with the town of Kalinkavičy to form a single administrative unit covering 2,756 km2, with a total population of 71,500.

References

 
Districts of Gomel Region